Scrotifera ("beasts with scrotum") is a clade of placental mammals that groups together grandorder Ferungulata, clade Apo-Chiroptera (aka order Chiroptera), other extinct members and their common ancestors. The clade Scrotifera is a sister group to the order Eulipotyphla (true insectivores) based on evidence from molecular phylogenetics, and together they make superorder Laurasiatheria. The last common ancestor of Scrotifera is supposed to have diversified ca. 73.1 to 85.5 million years ago.

Etymology 
Peter Waddell, then of the Institute of Statistical Mathematics, explains the etymology of the clade's name as follows:
The name comes from the word scrotum, a pouch in which the testes permanently reside in the adult male. All members of the group have a postpenile scrotum, often prominently displayed, except for some aquatic forms and pangolin (which has the testes just below the skin). It appears to be an ancestral character for this group, yet other orders generally lack this as an ancestral feature, with the probable exception of Primates.

Classification and phylogeny

History of phylogeny 
In year 2006 clade Pegasoferae (a clade of mammals that includes orders Chiroptera, Carnivora, Perissodactyla and Pholidota) was proposed as part of clade Scrotifera and sister group to the order Artiodactyla, based on genomic research in molecular systematics. The monophyly of the group is not well supported, and recent studies have indicated that this clade is not a natural grouping.

According to 2022 study of Matthew F. Jones, Nancy Simmons and K. Christopher Beard, two nyctitheres species (Eosoricodon terrigena and "Wyonycteris" microtis) were identified to be most closely related to bats.

Taxonomy 
 Clade: Scrotifera 
 Grandorder: Ferungulata 
 Clade: Apo-Chiroptera  (bats)
 Order: Chiroptera  (bats)
 Family: †Eosoricodontidae 
 Genus: †Acmeodon 
 Incertae sedis:
 †"Wyonycteris" microtis

Phylogeny 
The phylogenetic relationships of clade Scrotifera are shown in the following cladogram, reconstructed from mitochondrial and nuclear DNA and protein characters, as well as the fossil record:

See also 
 Mammal classification
 Laurasiatheria

References 

Mammal taxonomy